Alan Clark (1928–1999) was a British politician.

Alan, Allan, or Allen Clark may also refer to:

Alan Clark (bishop) (1919–2002), Bishop of East Anglia
Alan Clark (keyboardist) (born 1952), British keyboardist with Dire Straits
Alan M. Clark (born 1957), American author and illustrator
Alan Clark (television executive) (born 1949), Canadian television executive 
Alan Clark (businessman) (born 1959), South African businessman
Alan Clark (Arkansas politician) (born 1960), member of the Arkansas State Senate
Alan Dennis Clark (born 1945), British physicist
Allan Clark (born 1957), American football running back for several NFL teams
Allen George Clark (1898–1962), American-born British industrialist
Allan Clark (rugby league) (1881–1935), Australian rugby league administrator

Alan, Allan, or Allen Clarke may also refer to:

Alan Clarke (1935–1990), British film director
Alan Clarke (sports commentator) (1920–1969), BBC sports commentator
Alan W. Clarke (born 1949), American academic
Allen Clarke (educationalist) (1910–2007), British academic
Allan Clarke (singer) (born 1942), English singer with The Hollies
Allan Clarke (footballer) (born 1946), English international footballer for Leeds United
Allen Clarke (rugby union) (born 1967), Irish rugby union coach and former player
C. Allen Clarke (1863–1935), English working-class writer
 Alan D.B. Clarke (1922–2011), British psychologist
Alan Clarke (footballer, born 1962), Irish football midfielder

See also
Al Clark (disambiguation)